Cosmoclostis chalconota is a moth of the family Pterophoridae. It was described by Thomas Bainbrigge Fletcher in 1947 and is known from Uganda.

References

Endemic fauna of Uganda
Pterophorini
Insects of Uganda
Moths of Africa
Moths described in 1947